Tennessee's 18th Senate district is one of 33 districts in the Tennessee Senate. It has been represented by Republican Ferrell Haile, the current Senate president pro tempore, since 2012.

Geography
District 18 is based in Sumner County in the northern suburbs of Nashville, also covering Trousdale County and part of Davidson County. Communities in the district include Hendersonville, Gallatin, Hartsville, Portland, and some of Goodsville, White House, Millersville, and Nashville proper.

The district is located largely within Tennessee's 6th congressional district, with a small portion extending into the 5th district. It overlaps with the 40th, 44th, 45th, and 60th districts of the Tennessee House of Representatives, and borders the state of Kentucky.

2020

2016

2012

Federal and statewide results in District 18

References

18
Davidson County, Tennessee
Sumner County, Tennessee
Trousdale County, Tennessee